Lake Martha, oval in shape, is in the west-central part of Winter Haven, Florida. Lake Martha Drive surrounds two-thirds of the lake's perimeter. Lake Martha has a  surface area. On the northeast is a public park and boat ramp and across the street from this park is the Winter Haven campus of Polk State College. Winter Haven Hospital is on the lake's west side and a public park is at the southwest side of the lake. Residential housing surrounds the rest of the lake.

This lake has no public swimming beaches, but it has one public boat ramp. Fishing may be done by boat or from the shores of the two public parks on the lake. The park on the southwest side of the lake has a public fishing dock, as well as two picnic shelterhouses and a playground. The Hook and Bullet website says Lake Martha contains largemouth bass, rainbow trout and yellow perch. One person commented on the Fishing Works website that the fishing at the lake was good and that in four hours he caught seventeen largemouth bass.

References

Lakes of Polk County, Florida